Kolkata Knight Riders (KKR) is a franchise cricket team based in Kolkata, India, which plays in the Indian Premier League (IPL). They were one of the nine teams that competed in the 2012 Indian Premier League. They were captained by Gautam Gambhir. Kolkata Knight Riders emerged as winners in the IPL and qualified for the Champions League T20.

Background 
Due to the disbanding of Kochi Tuskers Kerala, each team played the remaining eight teams twice, once at home and once away. Therefore, each team played 16 matches. KKR bought back Brendon McCullum for $900,000 and West Indies Sunil Narine for $700,000. They also bought South-African Marchant de Lange for $50,000. The team replaced coach Dav Whatmore by Trevor Bayliss. Kolkata Knight Riders also launched a new marketing campaign titled "New Dawn. New Knights" and a new logo.

KKR got off to a poor start in the tournament, losing their first two games against Delhi Daredevils and Rajasthan Royals. However, they fought back with consecutive wins over Royal Challengers Bangalore and Rajasthan Royals. In the next match, however, they messed up an easy chase against Kings XI Punjab, losing narrowly by 2 runs. KKR's West Indian spinner Sunil Narine took the only five-wicket haul of the tournament (5–19) in that match and despite his team losing, he was declared as the Man of The Match. KKR then went on to win six matches in a row (except for a washed-out match against Deccan Chargers). However, the team's performances dipped in the following two matches, losing against Mumbai Indians and Chennai Super Kings. Eventually the team had a timely return to form, when they beat Mumbai Indians and Pune Warriors India in successive away matches, with the side bowling economically to defend average totals. This earned a second-place finish for the team at the end of the league stage and a semi-final match against Delhi Daredevils. An all-round performance from them saw Delhi being defeated by 18 runs, and KKR also qualifying for their maiden IPL final.

The final between the Knight Riders and the defending two-time champions Chennai Super Kings was held at the M. A. Chidambaram Stadium. A hamstring injury to Lakshmipathy Balaji resulted in the inclusion of Brett Lee and due to him being a foreign player, the team was required to leave out their wicket-keeper batsman Brendon McCullum to maintain the cap of 4 foreign players. Manvinder Bisla was brought in to replace McCullum. The team eventually won the match with the help of some impressive batting performance by Bisla (89 from 48 balls) and Jacques Kallis (69 from 49 balls) to become the champions of the tournament for the first time. Manvinder Bisla was declared Man of the Match and Sunil Narine was named Man of the Series.

Sunil Narine was the second-highest wicket-taker as well as player of the tournament, and also had the best economy rate in the tournament. The batting was led by skipper Gautam Gambhir, who was the second-highest run-getter of the tournament and scored 6 half-centuries out of a total of 11 from his team.

The state of West Bengal set up a grand felicitation involving Chief Minister of West Bengal Mamata Banerjee and Governor of West Bengal M K Narayanan . The Cricket Association of Bengal gifted the 17 members of the team with gold chain each and mementos. A victory parade for the team members was also organized on 28 May beginning from Hazra, Writers Building to the Eden Garden stadium where ten thousand spectators came to cheer for the team during a one-hour celebration that was compared to the India's World Cup victory lap at the Wankhede in Mumbai the year before. However, the celebration received criticism from media and certain political parties and had been ridiculed by some pools of society as it had only been organized for a club team. Shahrukh Khan, the team's co-owner and the state's brand ambassador, defended the decision."

Champions League Twenty20

KKR's maiden IPL victory in 2012 meant that they would now participate in the 2012 Champions League Twenty20 which was held in South Africa. They were in Group A along with Delhi Daredevils, Perth Scorchers, Auckland Aces and Titans. But disappointingly, they were eliminated in the group stage itself, winning only one game against the Titans, which they did so with a record breaking 99 run margin. This was the highest victory margin ever recorded in the CLT20 tournament. Losses to Delhi Daredevils and Auckland Aces followed by a washed out game against Perth meant that KKR finished 3rd in Group A and failed to qualify for the knock out stages of the tournament.

Indian Premier League

Season standings
Kolkata Knight Riders finished runners-up in the league stage of IPL 2012.

Match log

Champions League Twenty20

Match log

References

2012 Indian Premier League
Kolkata Knight Riders seasons